MS Côtes des Dunes is a Rodin-class ropax ferry operated by DFDS Seaways and currently in service between Dover and Calais.

She was built in 2001 by Aker Finnyards in Rauma, Finland (Yard No.437) for SeaFrance, as a passenger and roll-on roll-off car and commercial vehicle ferry; the engines are made by Wärtsilä. SeaFrance Rodin was launched on 19 May 2001. She has a sister ship,  which entered service in 2005.

On 16 November 2011, she was laid up in Calais Port, due to a Commercial Court ordering that Seafrance be liquidated. She resumed service with MyFerryLink on 20 August 2012.

On 8 June 2015, DFDS Seaways France announced that they had chartered the ferry and her sister ship initially for a two-year period with an option to purchase. The vessel has been renamed Côte des Dunes for service with DFDS Seaways from early 2016. The ferry, together with her sister ship, were occupied by striking MyFerryLink workers from the end of June until the end of July.  Both ships were vandalised by the staff and the whole interior was comprehensively trashed.   Afterwards, the ship was towed by two tugs to Dunkirk and was put in a dry dock and refurbished, with the interior being completely rebuilt and the exterior being repainted in the DFDS livery. The vessel entered service on Dover-Calais on 9 February 2016.

Machinery

The propulsion system is split into two rooms. The main engines are two Wärtsilä 12V46B units, each with an output of 11,700 kW, which are positioned forward. Two smaller Wärtsilä 8L46B units, each with a 7,800 kW output are located aft. These are combined in twin Schelde gearboxes, which each have a 4,750kVA ABB alternator driven from the aft side. These in turn drive 5m diameter Lips CP propellers. This arrangement gives a service speed of 25 knots at 85% MCR. Stability is afforded by a pair of ACH fin stabilizers controlled by a digital Pinfabb Stabilizers System.

Steering is carried out by twin Becker flap rudders, controlled by Porsgrunn steering gear. These rudders can be moved independently in harbour to assist the 1,800 kW Lips thruster located in the stern.  There are also three 1,800 kW thrusters in the bow and four Wärtsilä 8L20 engines driving l7l0kVA ABB alternators for electricity supply.

References

Ferries of France
Ferries of the United Kingdom
Ships built in Rauma, Finland
2001 ships